Stanisław Marusarz; 18 June 1913 – 29 October 1993) was a Polish Nordic skiing competitor in the 1930s.

Life
Stanisław Marusarz won a silver medal in ski jumping at the 1938 FIS Nordic World Ski Championships in Lahti — the first Pole ever to earn a medal in the championships. He also finished sixth in the individual nordic combined event at the 1933 FIS Nordic World Ski Championships in Innsbruck.

Marusarz was named one of the best young talents in ski jumping in the late 1920s and earned his first national title in 1931. Many skiers outside of the Nordic countries (Finland, Norway, and Sweden), who dominated classical skiing in the early 20th century, considered Marusarz "the best Nordic combiner in the world after [the] Norwegians."

On 15 March 1935, he set a ski jumping world record at 95 metres (312 ft) on Bloudkova velikanka hill in Planica, Kingdom of Yugoslavia and gained international success and recognition.

After that success, people waited for the moment when he would finish ahead of the Norwegians. His best chance came at the 1938 FIS Nordic World Ski Championships in Lahti where he struggled to win over the famous Ruud brothers: (Birger, Sigmund, and Asbjørn). Marusarz made the two best jumps in competition of 66 and 67 meters, earning him a total of 226.2 points, but the judges gave him much lower style scores than his rival (and friend) Asbjørn Ruud, the youngest of the three Ruud brothers – who jumped 63.5 and 64 m. Asbjørn Ruud won the competition with 226.4 points. Ruud thought about handing the gold over to Marusarz during the medal ceremony, but he settled on naming him the "Moral World Champion". Marusarz was favored to win the ski jumping competition at the 1939 FIS Nordic World Ski Championships in Zakopane, but finished a disappointing fifth because of an arm injury suffered prior to the competition.

Marusarz took part in five Winter Olympics. He finished 27th in the 18 km cross country event, 22nd in the nordic combined and 17th in ski jumping at the 1932 Winter Olympics in Lake Placid, New York. Four years later in Garmisch-Partenkirchen, he finished 5th in the ski jump and 7th in the Nordic combined. After World War II, Marusarz finished 27th in the ski jump event both at the 1948 Winter Olympics and the 1952 Winter Olympics. His last Winter Olympic participation (but not competition) was at Cortina d'Ampezzo in 1956, where at age 43 he ski-jumped as a forejumper.

After the German attack on Poland in 1939, he joined the AK and fought for Poland's independence until 1940, when he was captured and sentenced to death. However, Marusarz successfully escaped from a German prison and fled to Hungary, where he stayed until war's end.

In 1966 he created a memorable moment for Polish supporters, when organizers of the Four Hills Tournament asked him to make a show jump. At age 53, Marusarz jumped 66 meters.

Brother
Stanisław's brother Jan Marusarz was likewise a prewar Polish Olympic skier.  During World War II, Jan escorted famous Polish SOE agent Krystyna Skarbek across the Tatra Mountains, on skis, from Hungary into Poland.  After the war, Jan lived in London, England, where he served as a factotum at the Polish White Eagle Club.

Honours and awards
 Silver Cross of the Virtuti Militari
 Grand Cross of the Order of Polonia Restituta – 2010, posthumously; previously awarded the Commander's Cross and the Knight's Cross
 Cross of Valour – twice
 Gold Cross of Merit
 Armia Krajowa Cross
 Polish Army Medal – twice
 Medal of Victory and Freedom 1945
 Badge of Honor Soldier Army Headquarters
 Distinguished Master of Sports, 1951

Ski jumping world record

See also
 List of Poles

References

External links
 . Nordic combined profile
 . Ski jumping profile

1913 births
1993 deaths
Olympic cross-country skiers of Poland
Olympic Nordic combined skiers of Poland
Olympic ski jumpers of Poland
Cross-country skiers at the 1932 Winter Olympics
Nordic combined skiers at the 1932 Winter Olympics
Nordic combined skiers at the 1936 Winter Olympics
Ski jumpers at the 1932 Winter Olympics
Ski jumpers at the 1936 Winter Olympics
Ski jumpers at the 1948 Winter Olympics
Ski jumpers at the 1952 Winter Olympics
Polish male cross-country skiers
Polish male Nordic combined skiers
Polish male ski jumpers
Sportspeople from Zakopane
Polish Austro-Hungarians
Polish military personnel of World War II
Grand Crosses of the Order of Polonia Restituta
Recipients of the Silver Cross of the Virtuti Militari
Recipients of the Cross of Valour (Poland)
Recipients of the Gold Cross of Merit (Poland)
Recipients of the Armia Krajowa Cross
Recipients of the Polish Army Medal
FIS Nordic World Ski Championships medalists in ski jumping